Avicularia caei is a species of spiders in the family Theraphosidae found in Brazil. It was first described in 2017. The specific name honours Carlos Eduardo Gurgel Paiola, known as "Caê".

References

Theraphosidae
Spiders described in 2017
Spiders of Brazil